Kampsax A/S was a Danish engineering firm. Kampsax was established November 1, 1917 by Per Kampmann, Otto Kierulff and Jørgen Saxild. In 2002 it was bought by COWI A/S. Kampsax was world renowned for geographic information systems, mapping and road construction.

See more
 Veresk Bridge

References

Construction and civil engineering companies of Denmark
Defunct companies of Denmark
Danish companies established in 1917
Construction and civil engineering companies established in 1917